Shoot the Moon is the title of the fourth album by singer-songwriter Judie Tzuke, released in April 1982. It was Tzuke's first album for Chrysalis Records after leaving Elton John's label, The Rocket Record Company, who had released her first three albums. The album peaked at no.19 on the UK Album Chart.

Track listing
All songs by Mike Paxman and Judie Tzuke, except where indicated

Side one
 "Heaven Can Wait" – 4:32
 "Love on the Border" (Paxman, Paul Muggleton) – 3:14
 "Information" – 3:07
 "Beacon Hill" – 3:57
 "Don't Let Me Sleep" – 3:30

Side two
"I'm Not a Loser" (Muggleton, Bob Noble) – 3:28
 "Now There Is No Love at All" – 4:08
 "Late Again" (Noble, Tzuke) – 3:14
 "Liggers at Your Funeral" – 5:32
 "Water in Motion" – 3:34
 "Shoot the Moon" – 0:38

2006 Remastered CD bonus tracks
"Sold a Rose" – 4:11
 "Run on Luck" – 3:34
 "I'm Not a Loser" (Demo) – 3:24
 "How Do I Feel" (Demo) – 3:58

Personnel
Band members
Judie Tzuke – vocals, backing vocals
Mike Paxman – guitar
Bob Noble – keyboards
Paul Muggleton – accidental guitar, producer
John "Rhino" Edwards – bass guitar
Charlie Morgan – drums, percussion

Additional musicians
Jeff Rich – drums on "I'm Not a Loser"
Don Snow, Andy Clark – additional keyboards
The Dribble Brothers – male backing vocals

Production
Jeff Titmus - engineer, mixing

References

External links
Official website
Shoot The Moon

Judie Tzuke albums
1982 albums
Chrysalis Records albums
Albums recorded at Rockfield Studios